"The Road Virus Heads North" is a short story by Stephen King. The story first appeared in 999, an anthology published in 1999 and edited by Al Sarrantonio. In 2002, it was collected in King's Everything's Eventual. 

King wove the story around a painting he has at his home, which is disliked by his family. King himself is a fan of "moving picture" stories, which inspired him to write this tale.

Plot summary

The story follows Richard Kinnell, a successful horror writer, as he drives back from Boston to his home in Derry, Maine. Along the way, he comes across a yard sale where he notices a bizarre, disturbing painting of a sinister-looking man with sharply filed teeth driving his car across Boston's Tobin Bridge. Entitled "The Road Virus Heads North", the painting was created by a tortured genius who burned his other pieces of artwork before dying by suicide; the artist left a cryptic note explaining that he couldn't stand what was happening to him any longer, thus justifying his suicide. Kinnell, an avid collector of such oddities, purchases the painting without hesitation from the woman holding the sale.

As Kinnell travels north, he stops at his aunt's house to show her the painting. He quickly notices that some of the details in the painting have changed. He initially dismisses this by assuming he hadn't examined it closely enough. However, Kinnell quickly realizes that the painting is continuing to change. Deeply unsettled by his observations, he discards the painting at a rest stop.

Once home and much to his horror, Kinnell discovers that the painting has somehow arrived ahead of him and is hanging above his fireplace. It has changed yet again, this time depicting a horrific and gory scene of slaughter at the yard sale where he purchased it. Kinnell later overhears a news story about the brutal murder of the woman who had sold him the painting. He soon realizes that the man in the painting actually exists, and the ever-changing painting shows him getting closer and closer to his home. Confident that this will destroy it once and for all, Kinnell tosses the painting into the fireplace and sets it alight. He then decides to take a shower. Without warning, Kinnell passes out and has a nightmare about the horrors he has encountered throughout his day.

Upon awakening, Kinnell remembers that the artist burned all of his paintings, except this one. The painting survived Kinnell's attempts to destroy and discard it and the man in the painting has already arrived at his house. Kinnell tries to escape and fails. In the end, the painting gets him: the story's final passage describes Kinnell seeing the latest change to the painting, with fresh blood on the driver's seat of the killer’s car, and realizing that it is portraying what is about to happen to him.

Adaptations
"The Road Virus Heads North" was first filmed in 1999 by Dave Brock as a Stephen King "Dollar Baby" project and circulated on the film festival circuit.

The short story was adapted as an hour-long episode of the Turner Network Television mini-series Nightmares & Dreamscapes: From the Stories of Stephen King in 2006. The episode starred Tom Berenger as Kinnell.

It was also adapted by artist Glenn Chadbourne for the book The Secretary of Dreams, a collection of comics based on King's short fiction published by Cemetery Dance in December 2006.

See also
 Stephen King short fiction bibliography

References

External links

Stephen King Short Movies

1999 short stories
Short stories by Stephen King
Short stories adapted into films